Fonda is an unincorporated community in Rolette County, in the U.S. state of North Dakota.

History
Fonda was founded in 1905.  A post office called Fonda was established in 1907, and remained in operation until 1944. The community was named for Fonda, Iowa, former home of early settler Jay Edwards.

References

Unincorporated communities in Rolette County, North Dakota
Populated places established in 1905
1905 establishments in North Dakota
Unincorporated communities in North Dakota